Lunsford Lomax Lewis (March 17, 1846 – March 13, 1920) was a Virginia attorney, judge and political figure.

Biography
Lewis was born in Rockingham County, Virginia. His boyhood was spent in the valley of Virginia and he was educated at Center College in Kentucky and the University of Virginia. He graduated in 1867 with a Bachelor of Laws degree and was admitted to the bar.

He began practice in Culpeper, Virginia, and was soon designated by the United States Government as Commonwealth's Attorney for several counties in the northern part of the state. When he was only twenty-seven, Lewis was appointed by President Ulysses S. Grant United States Attorney for the Eastern District of Virginia. He was elected to the Supreme Court of Appeals in 1882 and served on the court through 1894, becoming its president when the court convened in January 1883. His term expired on January 1, 1895, and Judge Lewis resumed the practice of law in Richmond.  Lewis was president of the Virginia Bar Association during 1900–1901.

In December 1902, he was again appointed United States Attorney for the Eastern District of Virginia, this time being appointed by President Theodore Roosevelt. In 1905, he ran for Governor of Virginia, but was defeated, losing to Democrat Claude A. Swanson, and receiving 35.09% of the vote.

From 1910 to 1912, he was U.S. Attorney for the Eastern District once again, but resigned and practiced law until a few months before his death.

References

1846 births
1920 deaths
United States Attorneys for the Eastern District of Virginia
Virginia Republicans
Justices of the Supreme Court of Virginia